15817 Lucianotesi (or 1994 QC) is an Amor asteroid discovered on August 28, 1994, by A. Boattini and M. Tombelli at San Marcello Pistoiese.

References

External links 
 
 
 

015817
Discoveries by Maura Tombelli
Discoveries by Andrea Boattini
Named minor planets
19940828